Oldroydia is a genus of chitons belonging to the family Leptochitonidae.

The species of this genus are found in Northern America.

Species:
Oldroydia bidentata
Oldroydia percrassa

References

Chitons